SunWatch Indian Village / Archaeological Park, previously known as the Incinerator Site, and designated by the Smithsonian trinomial 33-MY-57, is a reconstructed Fort Ancient Native American village next to the Great Miami River on West River Road in Dayton, Ohio. The dwellings and site plan of the  site are based on lengthy archeological excavations sponsored by the Dayton Society of Natural History, which owns and operates the site as an open-air museum.  Because of its archaeological value, the site was listed in 1974 on the National Register of Historic Places.  Since that time, as the many years of archaeological research at the site have led to important findings about the Fort Ancient culture, SunWatch Indian Village was designated in 1990 as a National Historic Landmark.

History

Amateurs had found some prehistoric materials at the site in the 1960s.  Professional excavation began in 1971 as a salvage operation when the city planned a sewage treatment plant.  With the discovery of significant artifacts and the remains of a stockaded village, the city changed its plans to preserve the site.  Excavations continued through 1988 and are generally completed, although additional small studies have been done. The studies have revealed much about the original people's dwellings, social organization, diets, burial practices and other aspects of their lives at the site. The circular village, surrounded by defensive palisades, was occupied for about 20 years, with a total population of about 250. They depended on farming and hunting.

Scholars have named it Sun Watch because, since studies of the 1980s, they believe that a complex of posts in the plaza is related to astronomical measurements.  The Fort Ancient culture people, whose society was based on agriculture, would have planned rituals around a solar calendar.

With reconstructed dwellings, a plaza and gardens, and an interpretive center, the village was opened in 1988 to the public as an open-air museum.  Interpretive tours are offered as well as a variety of educational programs and special events developed in collaboration with Native American and other groups. Archaeological excavations are ongoing in the area, with special opportunities for school groups, graduate students, and adult learners.

Additional artifacts and exhibits are held in the related Boonshoft Museum of Discovery in Dayton. These help interpret the history and culture of the people, and show more of the artifacts recovered at the site than can be displayed at SunWatch.

See also
 Boonshoft Museum of Discovery
 List of National Historic Landmarks in Ohio

References

Further reading
 Allman, John C. (1968) "The Incinerator Village Site," Ohio Archaeologist 18 (2): 50–55.
 Cook, Robert A. (2008) SunWatch: Fort Ancient Development in the Mississippian World, Tuscaloosa: University of Alabama Press.
 Heilman, J., Malinda Lileas and Chris Turnbow (editors) (1988) A History of 17 Years of Excavation and Reconstruction: A Chronicle of 12th Century Human Values and the Built Environment Volumes I and II, Dayton Museum of Natural History, Dayton, Ohio.
 Heilman, James M. and Roger Hoefer (1981) "Possible Astronomical Alignments in a Fort Ancient Settlement at the Incinerator Site in Dayton, Ohio," in Archaeoastronomy in the Americas, ed. Ray Williamson, Los Altos, California: Ballena Press/ Center for Archaeoastronomy.

External links 

 SunWatch Indian Village / Archaeological Park
 NHL Summary
 Earthworks Timeline, Ancient Ohio Trail

1960s archaeological discoveries
Museums established in 1988
1988 establishments in Ohio
Fort Ancient culture
Archaeological sites in Ohio
Museums in Dayton, Ohio
National Register of Historic Places in Montgomery County, Ohio
National Historic Landmarks in Ohio
Native American museums in Ohio
Open-air museums in Ohio
Tourist attractions in Montgomery County, Ohio
Archaeological parks